Christopher John Hall (born 30 March 1957) is an English television producer. He has produced dramas primarily for the BBC, ITV, and Channel 4 networks, and worked for major British production companies, including Kudos, Carnival Films, Hat Trick Productions, World Productions and Tiger Aspect Productions.

Personal life 
Hall was born in London, the son of French actress and dancer Leslie Caron and English stage director Peter Hall. He has a sister, Jennifer Caron Hall, and four half-siblings, including director Edward Hall and actress Rebecca Hall. Hall was educated at Eaton House Belgravia, Bedales School and St Catharine's College, Cambridge. 

He is married to Jane Studd, with whom he has two sons, Freddie and Ben.

Career 

Hall started his career as an assistant director on feature films with David Hare (Strapless (1989) and Paris by Night), Ken Russell (The Lair of the White Worm (1988), and as a floor manager or assistant director on TV shows such as Inspector Morse and Porterhouse Blue. Working his way up through the grades, he became a line producer and then a fully fledged producer. In 1996, he produced The Final Passage, directed by his father Peter Hall, which won BAFTA and RTS awards for Cinematography.

One of his best-known productions is The Lost World (2001) starring Peter Falk, Bob Hoskins, James Fox, and Matthew Rhys. The production was noted for stripping the Conan Doyle text of racial overtones. He also produced the television film Archangel (2005) for the BBC, starring Daniel Craig, which was adapted from a 1998 Robert Harris thriller by Dick Clement and Ian La Frenais and filmed on location in Moscow and Latvia. 

In 2011, for Hat Trick and ITV, Hall produced Case Sensitive starring Olivia Williams. Hound of the Baskervilles (2002), which starred Richard E. Grant, John Nettles, Ian Hart, Richard Roxburgh and Geraldine James and received a BAFTA nomination for best sound, was another of Hall's productions. Aristocrats, based on the Stella Tillyard biography of the Lennox sisters in 1999, was another major production. 

One of Hall's drama productions, made as a Christmas show for the BBC in 2003, was the BAFTA-winning The Young Visiters starring Jim Broadbent, Hugh Laurie, Bill Nighy, Sally Hawkins and Simon Russell Beale. It was narrated by Alan Bennett, and directed by David Yates. The score, by Nicholas Hooper, won the BAFTA award for Original Television Music.

In 2005, he received a Primetime Emmy Award nomination for producing Pride (2004).

In 2011, he produced Hidden, a four-part drama written by Ronan Bennett, starring Philip Glenister, and was creative producer on Labyrinth. He served as producer on a 2012 adaptation of The Last Weekend by Blake Morrison, scripted by Mick Ford for Carnival Films and ITV. In 2013, he produced the Carnival Films ITV pilot Murder on the Home Front. He also completed a ten-part series Dracula for NBC and Sky Living, starring Jonathan Rhys Meyers. He produced the 13-part medical drama Critical for Sky One and Hat Trick written by Jed Mercurio. 

Hall produced The Durrells (2016–2019), a series based on Gerald Durrell's books about his family's life on the Greek island of Corfu. He produced the 2021 series Bloodlands, starring James Nesbitt. His production Showtrial for World Productions aired in 2021.

Productions 
 As producer

 Showtrial (2021)
 Bloodlands (2021)
 The Durrells (2016–19)
 Critical (2015)
 Dracula (2013)
 Murder on the Home Front (2013)
 The Last Weekend (2012)
 Labyrinth (2012)
 Hidden (2011)
 Case Sensitive (2011)
 Ice (2011)
 The Fixer (2008)
 Burn Up (2008)
 The Commander (4) (2006–2007)
 Trial & Retribution (6) (2005–2007)
 Archangel (2005)
 Pride (2004)
 The Young Visiters (2003)
 The Hound of the Baskervilles (2002)
 The Lost World (2001)
 Other People's Children (2000)
 Blue Murder (2000)
 Aristocrats (1999)
 The Final Passage (1996)

 As associate producer
Agatha Christie's Poirot (1996)
The Fragile Heart (1996)
Bugs (1995)
Anna Lee (1994)
London's Burning (1990–1994)

References

External links 
 

1957 births
Alumni of St Catharine's College, Cambridge
British people of American descent
British people of French descent
English television producers
People educated at Bedales School
People from London
Living people